The Yamaha TMX is a drum trigger module that uses PCM samples, it was made in Japan in 1993. It is a 1U rackmountable unit that has a 40 X 2 LCD display.

Features
The unit has 12 analogue triggers for external drum pads to trigger or play the device.

Hardware
The unit features a H8/532 16 bit digital-to-analog converter, MIDI interface, main signal and aux analogue out.

Editing
 volume gain
 pitch tuning
stereo panning position

PCM Wavetable
245 samples, 16 bits.

Notable users

References

External links

Drum machines